Marcus Wheeler may refer to:

 Marcus Wheeler (The Young and the Restless)
 Marcus Wheeler (footballer) (born 1994), Singaporean footballer